The High Court of New Zealand is the superior court of New Zealand. It has general jurisdiction and responsibility, under the Senior Courts Act 2016, as well as the High Court Rules 2016, for the administration of justice throughout New Zealand. There are 18 High Court locations throughout New Zealand, plus one stand-alone registry.

The High Court was established in 1841. It was originally called the "Supreme Court of New Zealand", but the name was changed in 1980 to make way for the naming of an eventual new Supreme Court of New Zealand.

The High Court is a court of first instance for serious criminal cases such as homicide, civil claims exceeding $350,000 and certain other civil cases.  In its appellate function, the High Court hears appeals from the District Court, other lower courts and various tribunals.

Composition and locations

The High Court comprises the Chief Justice (who is head of the judiciary) and up to 55 other Judges (which includes the Justices of the Supreme Court and the Justices of the Court of Appeal). The administrative head of the court is known as the Chief High Court Judge. Associate Judges of the High Court (formerly known as Masters up until May 2004) supervise the Court's preliminary processes in most civil proceedings, and have jurisdiction to deal with summary judgment applications, company liquidations, bankruptcy proceedings, and some other types of civil proceedings.

The High Court Judges and Associate Judges are based in Auckland, Wellington and Christchurch, but also travel on circuit to Whangarei, Hamilton, Rotorua, Tauranga, Gisborne, New Plymouth, Napier, Whanganui, Palmerston North, Nelson, Blenheim, Greymouth, Timaru, Dunedin, and Invercargill. The Court also has a registry in Masterton.

Jurisdiction

Criminal matters 
The High Court deals with the most serious types of criminal offences that exceed the District Court's jurisdiction. It deals with all category 4 offences, including murder, manslaughter and treason, as well as any other offence where the accused is likely to be sentenced to life imprisonment or preventive detention. A High Court Judge may direct that a serious category 2 and 3 "protocol" offence, such as aggravated wounding with intent, kidnapping or sexual violation of a child, be transferred from the District Court to the High Court for hearing. Most cases are heard before a Judge and jury, but may sometimes be heard before a Judge alone.

Civil matters
The Court has exclusive jurisdiction over all civil claims where the amount in dispute exceeds $350,000, and certain categories of proceedings.  The categories of proceeding which can only be commenced in the High Court includes matters concerning admiralty, certain applications relating to land (such as seeking its transfer or caveats), company law including liquidations, bankruptcy, the administration of estates and trusts, and trade mark and patent infringement. For civil claims worth less than $350,000, the High Court can have co-extensive jurisdiction with the District Court.

Appellate function
Rights of appeal to the High Court exist against the decisions of the District Court (except for jury trials), the Family Court, the Youth Court and the Environment Court and numerous administrative tribunals and regulatory bodies.

Judges of the High Court
The following are the Judges of the High Court :

Relationship with Australian courts
The Trans-Tasman Proceedings Act 2010 (NZ), the Trans-Tasman Proceedings Act 2010 (Aust) and the High Court Rules 2016 streamline the process for resolving civil proceedings with a trans-Tasman element.  The Acts cover many matters including service, interim relief, hearing matters remotely and the enforcement of judgments of courts of the other country.

See also
 Judicial review in New Zealand, relating to the High Court
 Sheriffs of the New Zealand High Court

References

External links
The High Court of New Zealand
High Court Rules 2016
Judicial Decisions Online

New Zealand court system
1841 establishments in New Zealand
Courts and tribunals established in 1841=